South Hero is the most populous town of both Lake Champlain's largest island of Grand Isle, as well as Grand Isle County, Vermont. South Hero's population was 1,674 at the 2020 census.

Geography

The town of South Hero includes the southern half of South Hero Island (also known as Grand Isle), as well as several smaller islands in Lake Champlain, including Providence Island and Stave Island to the southwest. To the west, across Lake Champlain, it is bordered by the towns of Plattsburgh and Peru in Clinton County, New York. To the east, across the eastern arm of Lake Champlain, is the town of Milton in Chittenden County, Vermont, and to the south across the lake is the town of Colchester, also in Chittenden County, to which it is connected via the Island Line Trail (with a 200 foot gap that is serviced by a small ferry).

U.S. Route 2 crosses the town, leaving north into the town of Grand Isle and to the east, across Lake Champlain over sandbar bridge, into a corner of the town of Milton. The unincorporated village of South Hero is in the center of the town, along US-2.

Demographics

As of the census of 2000, there were 1,696 people, 663 households, and 472 families residing in the town.  The population density was 112.3 people per square mile (43.4/km2).  There were 1,036 housing units at an average density of 68.6 per square mile (26.5/km2).  The racial makeup of the town was 97.94% White, 0.24% African American, 0.47% Native American, 0.29% Asian, 0.12% from other races, and 0.94% from two or more races. Hispanic or Latino of any race were 0.53% of the population.

There were 663 households, out of which 32.6% had children under the age of 18 living with them, 61.7% were married couples living together, 6.0% had a female householder with no husband present, and 28.7% were non-families. 21.0% of all households were made up of individuals, and 7.1% had someone living alone who was 65 years of age or older.  The average household size was 2.56 and the average family size was 2.98.

In the town, the population was spread out, with 24.9% under the age of 18, 5.5% from 18 to 24, 28.8% from 25 to 44, 29.5% from 45 to 64, and 11.1% who were 65 years of age or older.  The median age was 40 years. For every 100 females, there were 98.1 males. For every 100 females age 18 and over, there were 95.8 males.

The median income for a household in the town was $52,344, and the median income for a family was $61,198. Males had a median income of $41,250 versus $27,357 for females. The per capita income for the town was $26,532.  About 4.0% of families and 4.5% of the population were below the poverty line, including 3.8% of those under age 18 and 5.2% of those age 65 or over.

Though it has relatively few full-time residents, South Hero is much more populated in the summer months with seasonal residents and out-of-town vacationers and tourists usually from Canada.

Culture

South Hero has a strong agricultural system that combines multi-generational farming operations with newer sustainable and organic ventures. Apples and dairy continue to be mainstay industries with multiple orchards and dairy farms throughout the town.

The local K–8 school (Folsom Elementary) also houses the town's community center and is a focal point for many events, from library-based learning and programs to school-sponsored plays and athletic events. The town also hosts an annual marathon and half-marathon, which begins and ends in front of the school.

Notable people 

 Jewett W. Adams, fourth Governor of Nevada; born in South Hero
 Craig Alanson, New York Times bestselling author
 Ebenezer Allen, owner of the first settlement at South Hero and cousin of Ethan Allen
 Elizabeth Inness-Brown, novelist and educator
 Mitzi Johnson, Speaker of the Vermont House of Representatives
 Asa Lyon, U.S. Representative
 Tim Viens, NASCAR Driver for CMI Motorsports
 Barbara West, television news anchor, former ABC TV network journalist, and former Miss Vermont

Climate
This climatic region is typified by large seasonal temperature differences, with warm to hot (and often humid) summers and cold (sometimes severely cold) winters.  According to the Köppen Climate Classification system, South Hero has a humid continental climate, abbreviated "Dfb" on climate maps.

References

External links
 

 
 Town of South Hero official website
 South Hero Land Trust
 Virtual Vermont: South Hero
 City-Data.com
 ePodunk

 
Towns in Vermont
Burlington, Vermont metropolitan area
Towns in Grand Isle County, Vermont